Mohammad Shahidullah Bhuiyan is a politician and the former Member of Bangladesh Parliament of Narsingdi-4.

Career
Bhuiyan was elected to parliament from Narsingdi-4 as a Combined opposition candidate in 1988.

References

Living people
4th Jatiya Sangsad members
Year of birth missing (living people)